Katherine Gottlieb was the president and CEO of the Southcentral Foundation, an Alaska Native Healthcare Organization.

Life
She graduated from Alaska Pacific University with a Bachelor of Arts degree, a master's degree in business administration, and an honorary doctorate.

Southcentral Foundation's Nuka system of health care grew from fewer than 100 employees to more than 2,000; and from an operating budget of about $3 million to $323 million. 
Funding for SCF is 45 percent from the Indian Health Service, 50 percent from third party insurers or Medicaid, and the remaining 5 percent from foundation or grants.
Gottlieb resigned from her position at SCF on August 3, 2020, two weeks after the organization fired three dentists, including her husband Kevin Gottlieb for falsifying health records.

Awards
 2015 Baldrige Foundation Harry S. Hertz Leadership Award
 2013 National Indian Health Board Award
 2004 MacArthur Fellows Program

References

External links
 Southcentral Foundation

1950s births
Alaska Native people
Alaska Pacific University alumni
American health care chief executives
American women chief executives
Living people
MacArthur Fellows
People from Kenai Peninsula Borough, Alaska
People from Kodiak Island Borough, Alaska
Year of birth missing (living people)
21st-century American women